Dabri Chhoti is a village in Churu district, Rajasthan, India, situated on the road between Taranagar and Sahwa.and sahwa 15 km away from village, on State highway 15.
Water pump on Dabri chhoti bus stand . And  distance from village to highway

References

Villages in Churu district